The Zadar basketball tournament was an international basketball tournament between clubs, which was held annually from 2014 to 2019 and took place in Zadar, Croatia, each summer. The competition format was a tournament style.

Fenerbahçe Beko won the most of tournament titles. Only Fenerbahçe Beko Basketball, Darüşşafaka and Anadolu Efes Pilsen won any of the tournament titles since the inaugural season.

History
The Tournament was held annually every September. The first season was inaugurated in 2014. It is played in the Krešimir Ćosić Hall.

List of winners

Performance by club

See also 
 Mirza Delibašić Memorial

References

External links
Zadar Basketball Tournament Website

Basketball competitions in Croatia
Recurring sporting events established in 2014
Recurring sporting events disestablished in 2019
Sport in Zadar